Planinca is a small settlement in the Municipality of Šentjur in eastern Slovenia. It lies in the hills south of Jakob pri Šentjurju, just off the road towards Kalobje. The settlement, and the entire municipality, are included in the Savinja Statistical Region, which is in the Slovenian portion of the historical Duchy of Styria.

References

External links
Planinca at Geopedia

Populated places in the Municipality of Šentjur